The Magnolia School District is a community public school district that serves students in pre-kindergarten through eighth grade in Magnolia, in Camden County, New Jersey, United States.

As of the 2018–19 school year, the district, comprising one school, had an enrollment of 408 students and 39.1 classroom teachers (on an FTE basis), for a student–teacher ratio of 10.4:1.

The district is classified by the New Jersey Department of Education as being in District Factor Group "CD", the sixth-highest of eight groupings. District Factor Groups organize districts statewide to allow comparison by common socioeconomic characteristics of the local districts. From lowest socioeconomic status to highest, the categories are A, B, CD, DE, FG, GH, I and J.

For ninth grade through twelfth grade, public school students attend Sterling High School, a regional high school district that also serves students from Somerdale and Stratford, along with the sending districts of Hi-Nella and Laurel Springs. The high school is located in Somerdale. As of the 2018–19 school year, the high school had an enrollment of 958 students and 69.8 classroom teachers (on an FTE basis), for a student–teacher ratio of 13.7:1.

School
The Magnolia School had an enrollment of 419 students in the 2017-18 school year.
Paul Sorrentino, Principal

Administration
Core members of the district's administration are:
Karen Macpherson, Superintendent
Greg Gontowski, Board Secretary / School Business Administrator

Board of education
The district's board of education, with five members, sets policy and oversees the fiscal and educational operation of the district through its administration. As a Type II school district, the board's trustees are elected directly by voters to serve three-year terms of office on a staggered basis, with either one or two seats up for election each year held (since 2012) as part of the November general election.

References

External links
Magnolia School District

Data for Magnolia School District, National Center for Education Statistics
Sterling High School

Data for Sterling High School, National Center for Education Statistics

Magnolia, New Jersey
New Jersey District Factor Group CD
School districts in Camden County, New Jersey